Jack Connolly may refer to:

 Jack Connolly (ice hockey, born 1989), American ice hockey player 
 Jack Connolly (ice hockey, born 1900), Major League ice hockey player in the 1920s

See also
 John Connolly (disambiguation)